The Hyrcanian forests are a zone of lush lowland and montane forests covering about  adjoining the shores of the Caspian Sea of Iran and part of that of Azerbaijan. The forest is named after the ancient region of Hyrcania. In the World Wide Fund for Nature categorization, the ecoregion is referred to as the Caspian Hyrcanian mixed forests. 

Since 5 July 2019, the Hyrcanian Forests have been designated a UNESCO World Heritage Site.

Geography
In Iran, the Hyrcanian ecoregion comprises a long strip along the southern coast of the Caspian Sea and the northern slopes of the Alborz mountains. It covers parts of five provinces, from east to west: North Khorasan, Golestan ( being its south and southwest plus eastern regions of the Gorgan plain), Mazandaran, Gilan and Ardabil.

The Golestan National Park spans the boundary of Golestan and Mazandaran provinces. The Masooleh, Ghaleh Roodkhan and Astara forest watersheds are in Gilan province) and Ardabil Province. At higher elevations to the south, the ecoregion grades into the Elburz Range forest steppe.

In southeastern Azerbaijan the ecoregion spans through the Lankaran Lowland and the Talysh Mountains.

The ecoregion's climate is humid subtropical at lower altitudes; at mid-altitudes it has oceanic features, while in the mountains it is humid continental. Summer is a humid but low-precipitation season. Alborz is the highest mountain range in the Middle East and it captures, by relief precipitation and dew point mists, much of the evaporation of the southern Caspian Sea.

Flora

The natural forest vegetation is temperate deciduous broadleaved forest. 32.7 percent of volume of Hyrcanian forest is of oriental beech (Fagus orientalis). A main feature of the region is the lack of conifers; only relics of coniferous species are present, which include European yew (Taxus baccata), junipers (Juniperus spp.), Mediterranean cypress (Cupressus sempervirens var. horzontalis) and Chinese arborvitae (Platycladus orientalis).

The Caspian Sea coastal plains were once covered by chestnut-leaved oak (Quercus castaneifolia), European box (Buxus sempervirens), black alder (Alnus glutinosa subsp. barbata), Caucasian alder (Alnus subcordata), Caspian poplar (Populus alba var. caspica) and Caucasian wingnut (Pterocarya fraxinifolia), but these forests have been almost entirely converted to urban and agricultural land. (Mosadegh, 2000; Marvie Mohadjer, 2007)

The lower slopes of Talysh and Alborz Mountains below  harbor diverse humid forests containing chestnut-leaved oak, European hornbeam (Carpinus betulus), Persian ironwood (Parrotia persica), Caucasian zelkova (Zelkova carpinifolia), Persian silk tree (Albizia julibrissin), and date-plum (Diospyros lotus) along with shrubs holly (Ilex hyrcana), Ruscus hyrcanus, Danaë racemosa and Atropa pallidiflora, and lianas Smilax excelsa and Hedera pastuchovii (Mosadegh, 2000; Marvie Mohadjer, 2007). Persian Ironwood is endemic to the Talysh Mountains and northern Iran and nearly pure stands of the tree can be particularly dramatic, with lichen-covered branches twisting together and only dead leaves in the deep shade of the forest floor. In addition, the ironwood's yellow leaves turn a faint lilac in the fall.

From its floristic composition, these beech forests are linked with European forests and with affinities to the beech forests of the Balkans. However, local conditions of aspect and edaphic factors, such as soil moisture and depth, are all of importance in determining the composition of the vegetation, which leads to the establishment of different beech subcommunities. (Mosadegh, 2000; Marvie Mohadjer, 2007)

Upper mountain and subalpine zones are characterized by Caucasian oak, Oriental hornbeam, shrublands and steppes. Alpine tundra and meadows occur at the highest elevations.

Other native tree species include Caspian locust (Gleditsia caspica), velvet maple (Acer velutinum), Cappadocian maple (Acer cappadocicum), European ash (Fraxinus excelsior), Wych elm (Ulmus glabra), wild cherry (Prunus avium), wild service tree (Sorbus torminalis) and lime tree (Tilia platyphyllos).

Fauna
The Caspian tiger (Panthera tigris tigris) was once the apex predator of the biome before its extinction. The remaining large mammals include the Persian leopard (Panthera pardus tulliana), Eurasian lynx (Lynx lynx), brown bear (Ursus arctos), wild boar (Sus scrofa), wolf (Canis lupus), golden jackal (Canis aureus), jungle cat (Felis chaus), Caucasian badger (Meles canescens), and Eurasian otter (Lutra lutra).

This ecoregion is the main green resting area for birds migrating between central-northern Russia and Africa so a key habitat for many bird species.  Notable birds seen here are the greylag goose (Anser anser), white-fronted goose (Anser albifrons), Little bustard (Tetrax tetrax), glossy ibis (Plegadis falcinellus), Eurasian spoonbill (Platalea leucorodia), night heron (Nycticorax nycticorax), red-breasted goose (Branta ruficollis), peregrine falcon (Falco peregrinus), Dalmatian pelican (Pelecanus crispus), cattle egret (Bubulcus ibis), squacco heron (Ardeola ralloides), greater flamingo (Phoenicopterus roseus), white-headed duck (Oxyura leucocephala), and Caspian snowcock (Tetraogallus caspius).

Endemic species 
The Hyrcanian forests are thought to have served as a refugium for certain species during changing climatic conditions. The Iranian edible dormouse (Glis persicus) is an endemic of this ecoregion, and is thought to have evolved when mid-Miocene climatic change led to the fragmentation of the ancestral Glis population, with one such population fragment surviving in these forests and evolving into a new species. The bat Myotis hyrcanicus is likely also endemic to this region. The region is also known to preserve a unique lineage of bicolored shrew (Crocidura leucodon) that diverged from the other lineages during the mid-Pleistocene, about 1 million years ago.

Protected areas
The diversity and endemism of the species make the Caspian Hyrcanian forests a priority and unique feature for species conservation.  Habitats are threatened by conversion into tea, vegetable, fruit, and vine plantations, unsustainable forestry and poaching.

Protected areas in Azerbaijan include:

 Gizil-Agach State Reserve – 
 Hirkan National Park - 

Protected areas in Iran include:

 Golestan National Park
 Jahan Nama Protected Area
 Central Alborz Protected Area
 Lisar Protected Area
 Siah Keshim Protected Area
 Dodangeh Wildlife Refuge
 Neka Miankaleh Wildlife Refuge
 Selkeh Wildlife Refuge
 Dashtenaz Wildlife Refuge

Gallery

See also
Hyrcania
Geography of Iran
Geography of Azerbaijan
List of World Heritage Sites in Western Asia

References

External links
Coastal Profiles - I.R.Iran

Ecoregions of Azerbaijan
Ecoregions of Iran
Ecoregions of Asia
Ecoregions of Europe
Forests of Azerbaijan
Forests of Iran

Alborz (mountain range)
Astara District
Lankaran District
Lerik District
Masally District
Yardimli District
Geography of Gilan Province
Geography of Golestan Province
Geography of Mazandaran Province
Mountain ranges of Azerbaijan
Mountain ranges of Iran
Palearctic ecoregions
Temperate broadleaf and mixed forests
World Heritage Sites in Iran